Bošany is a village and municipality in Partizánske District in the Trenčín Region of western Slovakia.

History
The village was established in 1924 by merging the former villages of Veľké Bošany and Malé Bošany. In 1960, the former village of Baštín ) was also merged into Bošany.

Geography
The municipality lies at an altitude of 185 metres and covers an area of 14.46 km². It has a population of about 4295 people.

Famous people
 Ján Chryzostom Korec, Slovak Cardinal of the Roman Catholic Church

Genealogical resources

The records for genealogical research are available at the state archive "Statny Archiv in Nitra, Slovakia"

 Roman Catholic church records (births/marriages/deaths): 1691-1899 (parish A)

See also
 List of municipalities and towns in Slovakia

References

External links

  Official page
https://web.archive.org/web/20070513023228/http://www.statistics.sk/mosmis/eng/run.html
Surnames of living people in Bosany

Villages and municipalities in Partizánske District